The 10-mile run is a long-distance running event over a distance of ten miles (16.1 kilometres). It can be held on a road course or on a running track. Also referred to as a 10-miler or 10 miles run, it is a relatively common distance in countries that use the mile as a unit of measure. Ten miles is roughly an intermediate distance between the 10K run and the half marathon (21.1 km). The level of endurance required to run the distance means it attracts more seasoned runners than shorter events and usually requires a period of preparation for first-time attempts.

On the track, a noted professional athlete named Reed is believed to have run 10 miles in under an hour at the Artillery Ground, London, in 1774. The event was included in the AAA Championships from 1880 to 1972, but it has never formed part of major championships. The IAAF, now called World Athletics, ratified records for the event from 1921 to 1975 when all records at imperial distances other than the one mile run were discontinued.

As a road race, the distance most frequently occurs in non-international, low-level races. Races that attract international-standard athletes are mostly based in the United States, United Kingdom and the Low Countries. Among the longest running 10-mile competitions are the Ten Mile Road Race in Thunder Bay (first held 1910) and the Harold Webster Memorial 10 mile (first held in 1920), both set in the Canadian province of Ontario. The Association of Road Racing Statisticians (ARRS) records world records for the distance, with the approved times for men and women being Haile Gebrselassie's time of 44:23.0 minutes, set on 4 September 2005 at the Tilburg Ten Miles, and Teyba Erkesso's 51:43.4, set on 1 April 2007 at the Cherry Blossom Ten Mile Run. The ARRS only recognises performances at the given distance, rather than intermediate times. Several women have run the 10 miles in faster times as part of a half marathon, including Mary Keitany (50:05) and Ruth Chepng'etich in the marathon (49:49)

All-time top 25 (road)
+ = en route to longer performance

Men
Correct as of December 2022.

Notes
Below is a list of other times equal or superior to 45:23:
Leonard Komon also ran 44:48 (2012).
Martin Mathathi also ran 44:52 (2009), 44:59 (2010), 45:01 (2006).
Charles Kamathi also ran 45:16 (2009).
Bernard Kiprop Koech also ran 45:21 (2015).
Rodgers Kwemoi also ran 45:23 (2018).

Women
Correct as of February 2022.

Notes
Below is a list of other times equal or superior to 51:33:
Lornah Kiplagat also ran 50:54 (2002).
Susan Chepkemei also ran 51:23 (2001).
Hilde Kibet also ran 51:30 (2010).
Joyce Chepkirui also ran 51:33 (2013).

Several athletes posted times that would qualify for the above list if they were performed in sanctioned events for the 10-mile distance:
Brigid Kosgei: 49:21 (8/9/2019) 
Mary Jepkosgei Keitany: 50:05 (18/2/2011) 
Deena Kastor: 51:31  (2/4/2006)

10-mile road races

10-mile (track) 

+ = en route in one hour run
p = professional athlete

Notes

References

 
Road running distances
Long-distance running distances